Donna Marcella Borghese (1911-2002) was a manufacturer of cosmetics.

History 
Marcella Fazi was born in Umbria in 1911. In 1937 she became the second wife of the widowed nobleman Paolo Borghese, Duke of Bomarzo and Prince of Sant’ Angelo e San Polo, and acquired the title of Princess.  She gave birth to twin boys, Francesco and Livio, the same year. She also had two daughters, Rosanna and Anita Mauritzi, from a previous marriage. She had two grandchildren from her first marriage, Sylvia and Valentina. From her second marriage she had five grandchildren; Scipione, Ilaria and Lorenzo from Francesco's side and from Livio's side, Luca and Matteo.

The fashion-conscious princess had toiletries, including makeup, made specifically for her using the natural ingredients found around the Villa Borghese in Rome, where the family lived. She wanted to create a line of lipsticks in a wider variety of shades than what was available at the time, and once Pope Pius XII gave the cosmetics his blessing, pushed forward with the idea.

Princess Marcella Borghese died in 2002 in her home in Montreux, Switzerland. She was 90 years old, and was buried in the family crypt at the Basilica of Santa Maria Maggiore in Rome.

Business 
In 1956, Borghese met cosmetics magnate, Charles Revson, the founder of Revlon. The two struck up a lifelong friendship, as he helped her to create her cosmetics line, which Revlon then licensed under the Princess Marcella Borghese brand name.

One of Princess Marcella Borghese's first collections included brightly colored lipsticks and nail colors to match the vivid colors of her fashion designer friend, Emilio Pucci's knitwear. Her Montecatini Cosmetic line, named after her favorite spa (and an ancient town in Tuscany), used the purported healing properties of the Terme di Montecatini mud and the mineral waters. The Princess was one of the first people to create a skincare line which was based on the natural therapies of a spa.

In 1992 Revlon sold the Borghese brand to Halston Borghese International Limited, a new company set up in New York by four Saudi investors (all brothers) to buy and hold Revlon’s Halston and Princess Marcella Borghese divisions. Borghese remained involved in the line named after her until her death.

Today, the company is known as simply Borghese and is based in New York City. It has been run by CEO Georgette Mosbacher since 2000.

References

1911 births
2002 deaths
People from Umbria
Cosmetics people
History of cosmetics
Marcella
Cosmetics companies of the United States
Revlon brands